Andrew Paul Hendry (born March 24, 1968) is a Canadian biologist and professor in the Department of Biology and the Redpath Museum at McGill University. He holds dual citizenship of both Canada and the United States. He has been named a tier 1 Canada Research Chair from 2018 to 2024.

References

External links

Living people
American emigrants to Canada
Canadian biologists
People from Woodland, California
University of Victoria alumni
University of Washington alumni
Canada Research Chairs
1968 births